The Dana Open Presented By Marathon, is a women's professional golf tournament on the LPGA Tour. It was founded  in 1984 and has been played yearly, except in 1986 and 2011, in Sylvania, Ohio, a suburb northwest of Toledo. The tournament is televised by Golf Channel.

History
The tournament was founded after PGA Tour caddie Judd Silverman, a Toledo native, sought to bring a ladies professional golf tournament to his hometown.  He contacted sponsors and actor Jamie Farr, also a Toledo native, brought his name and several of his celebrity friends to the tournament. Throughout the history of the event, children's charities in Northwest Ohio and Southern Michigan have been the charitable beneficiaries of the tournament. They have received more than $13 million during the event's history.

From 2004 to 2010, the title sponsor was Owens Corning, the world's largest manufacturer of fiberglass and related products, headquartered in Toledo, near the site of the tournament. In 2012, they became a presenting sponsor. Kroger, one of the largest American supermarket chains, with headquarters in Cincinnati, has also been involved as a sponsor of the tournament since 1997. Owens-Illinois (O-I) became a sponsor in 2012.

From 1984 to 1988, the tournament was held in the village of Holland at Glengarry Country Club  which became Stone Oak Country Club  The event moved several miles north in 1989 to its current home, Highland Meadows Golf Club in Sylvania, just south of the Michigan state line.

The largest playoff in LPGA history took place at the 1999 Jamie Farr, a six-player affair involving Karrie Webb, Carin Koch, Sherri Steinhauer, Se Ri Pak, Kelli Kuehne, and Mardi Lunn. Defending champion Pak won it on first hole of sudden death, sinking a  birdie putt.

In 2007, Pak won the Farr for the fifth time, becoming only the fourth player on the LPGA Tour to win the same tournament five times.

The tournament was at risk of ending after 2009, due to a variety of circumstances including the slumping worldwide economy and reported dissatisfaction with LPGA Commissioner Carolyn Bivens. Late in August 2009, after Bivens had resigned under pressure, it was announced that the tournament would continue for at least one more year, albeit with a sharply reduced purse.

On June 29, 2010, LPGA Commissioner Michael Whan announced the Farr Classic would return for at least three more years beginning in 2012. The tournament took a one-year hiatus in 2011, as the Toledo area hosted the U.S. Senior Open, a major championship on the Champions Tour, at the Inverness Club in late July.  A similar break occurred in 1986, when the PGA Championship was at Inverness in August.

On December 2, 2011, tournament director Judd Silverman announced that the Jamie Farr Classic would have a new name and a new logo; it became  the Jamie Farr Toledo Classic Presented by Kroger, Owens Corning and O-I. On January 8, 2013, the LPGA announced that Marathon Petroleum was replacing Jamie Farr as the title sponsor. In 2016, the event received broadcast network coverage for the first time when CBS Sports televised the final round live.

Tournament names through the years:
1984–1996: Jamie Farr Toledo Classic
1997–2000: Jamie Farr Kroger Classic
2001–2003: Jamie Farr Kroger Classic Presented by ALLTEL
2004–2010: Jamie Farr Owens Corning Classic Presented by Kroger
2012: Jamie Farr Toledo Classic Presented by Kroger, Owens Corning and O-I
2013–2018: Marathon Classic Presented by Owens Corning and O-I
2019–2021: Marathon Classic Presented by Dana
2022–present: Dana Open Presented by Marathon

Winners

Source:
Note: Green highlight indicates scoring records.

Multiple winners
Four players have won the event more than once.
5 wins: Se Ri Pak (1998, 1999, 2001, 2003, 2007)
2 wins: Penny Hammel (1985, 1989), Kelly Robbins (1994, 1997), and Lydia Ko (2014, 2016)

Tournament records

Source:

See also
Glass City Classic: a LPGA Tour event that was played at Highland Meadows Golf Club in 1966.

References

External links

LPGA official tournament microsite
Jamie Farr official website
Highland Meadows Golf Club
Stone Oak Country Club former venue, originally Glengarry C.C.

LPGA Tour events
Golf in Ohio
Sports competitions in Ohio
Sports in Toledo, Ohio
Recurring sporting events established in 1984
1984 establishments in Ohio
Women's sports in Ohio